Kiril Georgiev (born 18 July 1936) is a Bulgarian weightlifter. He competed in the men's featherweight event at the 1960 Summer Olympics.

References

External links
 

1936 births
Living people
Bulgarian male weightlifters
Olympic weightlifters of Bulgaria
Weightlifters at the 1960 Summer Olympics
Sportspeople from Varna, Bulgaria